The Ol-class tankers were Royal Fleet Auxiliary "fast fleet tankers" tasked with providing fuel, food, fresh water, ammunition and other supplies to Royal Navy vessels around the world.

Class history
Consequently, the class became Olwen class, and thereafter Ol class.

The three ships saw service in a wide range of locations, including during the Falklands War, which saw Olmeda take part in the recapture of Thule Island, and in the Persian Gulf during the 1990/91 Gulf War.

One modified Ol-class vessel, was built for the former Imperial Iranian Navy in 1977. The vessel was delivered to the Islamic Republic of Iran Navy in 1984, and was lost on 2 June 2021.

Construction programme

References

External links
 O-class fleet replenishment tankers

Auxiliary replenishment ship classes
 Ol
Ship classes of the Islamic Republic of Iran Navy